In Nordic mythology, Naglfari is the father of Auðr by the personified night, Nótt. Naglfar is attested in a single mention in the Prose Edda (written in the 13th century by Snorri Sturluson) book Gylfaginning, where he is described as one of a series of three husbands of Nótt, and that the couple produced a son, Auðr. No additional information is provided about Naglfari.

Rudolf Simek theorizes that Snorri invented Naglfari but states that his reason for doing so is unknown.

Notes

References

 Faulkes, Anthony (Trans.) (1995). Edda. Everyman. 
 Lindow, John (2001). Norse Mythology: A Guide to the Gods, Heroes, Rituals, and Beliefs. Oxford University Press. 
 Simek, Rudolf (2007) translated by Angela Hall. Dictionary of Northern Mythology. D.S. Brewer. 

Norse gods